Frank Booth (1887–1950) was an American soccer right full back who spent one season in the American Soccer League and six in the Southern New England Soccer League. He was born in Fall River, Massachusetts.

Booth played for the Fall River Rovers of the Southern New England Soccer League beginning at least during the 1915-1916 season, if not earlier.  In 1916, 1917 and 1918, the Rovers met Bethlehem Steel in the finals of the National Challenge Cup. The team lost in 1916 and 1918, but won in 1917. Booth played all three finals. He remained with the Rovers until the establishment of the American Soccer League in 1921. That year, he signed with Fall River United of the new league. He spent only one season, playing twenty league and two National Challenge Cup games before leaving the league at the end of the season.

References

1887 births
Sportspeople from Fall River, Massachusetts
Soccer players from Massachusetts
American soccer players
American Soccer League (1921–1933) players
Fall River Marksmen players
Fall River Rovers players
Southern New England Soccer League players
1950 deaths
Association football defenders